Moss Kent Dickinson (June 1, 1822 – July 19, 1897) was a Canadian businessman, mayor of Ottawa from 1864 to 1866, Member of Parliament from 1882 to 1887 and the founder of Manotick.

Background 
He was born in Denmark, New York in 1822 to parents Barnabus and Lydia Dickinson. A descendant of the Mayflower Pilgrims, the Dickinson family had been settled in the United States for generations. His family moved to Cornwall, Ontario in 1827. By 1847, he had established a business transporting goods on the Rideau Canal between Ottawa and Kingston. By 1850, Moss owned 16 steamers and 60 barges. Locals started to call him the 'King of the Rideau'.

Dickinson saw promise on Long Island in the middle of the Rideau River. He purchased seven acres of land in the town he named Manotick. Dickinson chose the name 'Manotick' from the Algonquin word for 'island'.

Career 
In 1860, with Joseph Merrill Currier, he completed construction of the Long Island Flouring Mill in Manotick, Ontario. He also built a sawmill, carding mill and bung factory. This served as the economic basis for the formation of the village. The grist mill is today called Watson's Mill and is open to the public as a museum.

Moss Kent Dickinson applied to five Order-in-Councils during his life. His son, George Dickinson, applied to two. The Orders-in-Councils were either about a lease of water power or for timber limits. The timber grants were in the North-West Territories. The timber grants provided additional income for the Dickinsons. John A. Macdonald signed Moss Kent Dickinson's and George's Orders-in-Council. It was more of a standard procedure of the Prime Minister than an indicator of a specific benevolence extended towards the family. Wilfrid Laurier had signed George's last Order-in-Council dated March 31, 1903. George had applied for a grant of water bulkheads to Long Island.

Politics 
Dickinson served as mayor of Ottawa from 1864 to 1866. Under his leadership, the Ottawa City Passenger Railway was incorporated. It was the first public transit system in Ottawa. The system consisted of horse-drawn tramcars that rode on iron rails.

Dickinson was also elected in the riding of Russell in the 1882 federal election. (Dickinson was the last non-Liberal MP for Russell County until Pierre Lemieux was elected in 2006, a span of 124 years.) His son George Lemuel also served in the House of Commons.

Connection to Sir John A. Macdonald 
Macdonald visited Manotick once, on February 10, 1887. He gave a speech at the large hall over Dickinson's lumber mill. Macdonald mentioned that he was "happy to meet his constituents in Manotick." He had dinner at the Dickinson's residence afterwards. Their conversations were brief, as Macdonald left that night to return to Ottawa.

Patronage was a key theme in Dickinson's relationship with Macdonald. This was prominent in their correspondence. It spanned through many years, with the first letter in 1863 and the last in the year of Macdonald's death, 1891. The 28 years of correspondence yielded only 38 letters. Dickinson wrote 31 of them and Macdonald wrote 7. Most of the letters were about appointments or political favours for him or his friends.

Family 
Together with his wife Elizabeth, Dickinson had five children: George, Charlotte, William, Lydia and Elizabeth. He also had another son, Alpheus, who died in infancy. Lydia died at age 15 of tuberculosis. None of Dickinson's children ever married, leaving him with no descendants.

Legacy 
He died in Manotick in 1897. Dickinson is buried in Beechwood Cemetery beside his wife. Dickinson Days are celebrated in Manotick on the first weekend in June, to coincide with Dickinson's birthday.

References

Bibliography

External links
 

1822 births
1897 deaths
Mayors of Ottawa
Members of the House of Commons of Canada from Ontario
Conservative Party of Canada (1867–1942) MPs
American emigrants to pre-Confederation Ontario
People from Lewis County, New York
People from Cornwall, Ontario
Immigrants to Upper Canada